The 11th Texas Cavalry Regiment was a unit of mounted volunteers that fought in the Confederate States Army during the American Civil War. The regiment organized in October 1861 and fought at Chustenahlah against pro-Union Native Americans that winter and at Pea Ridge against Union troops in March 1862. The regiment dismounted to fight at First Corinth, Richmond, and Stones River in 1862. After being remounted, the 11th Texas Cavalry fought at Chickamauga, in Wheeler's October 1863 Raid, in the Atlanta campaign, in Sherman's March to the Sea, and in the Carolinas campaign. When the Confederate army surrendered in April 1865, its remaining soldiers dispersed.

See also
List of Texas Civil War Confederate units

References

Units and formations of the Confederate States Army from Texas
1861 establishments in Texas
1865 disestablishments in Texas
Military units and formations disestablished in 1865
Military units and formations established in 1861